Rede4, now Pop, is a Mobile Virtual Network Operator, launched in 2005 in Portugal, over the network Optimus Telecomunicações, S.A.

Telecommunications companies established in 2005
Mobile virtual network operators
2005 establishments in Portugal